The Ford Thames 300E is a car derived van that was produced by Ford UK from 1954 to 1961. The Thames (or Thames Trader) name was given to all available sizes of commercial vehicle produced by Ford in Britain from the 1950s through to 1965. In that year the Thames and Trader names were discontinued.

History
The 300E was introduced in July 1954, based on the Ford Anglia / Prefect 100E saloon range. It shared its bodyshell and 1172 cc sidevalve four-cylinder engine with the Ford Escort and Ford Squire estate car versions of the line.The bodyshell was optimized for use as a panel van rather than an estate with its two short passenger doors and shorter overall length than the saloons. Initially produced only as a single model with  carrying capacity, the range was later expanded with the introduction of Standard and Deluxe  variants. All three offered the same  load volume. Production totalled 196,885 examples comprising 139,267 5 cwt, 10,056 Standard 7 cwt and 47,562 Deluxe 7 cwt units.

300E production ended in April 1961 and the van's replacement, the Anglia 105E based Thames 307E, was introduced in June of the same year.

References

External links 

 Ford Thames and Morris Mini 1/4-ton vans at Hemmings Motor News

Thames 300E
Vehicles introduced in 1954
Vans
1950s cars
1960s cars